Harry Martinson (6May 190411February 1978) was a Swedish writer, poet and former sailor. In 1949 he was elected into the Swedish Academy. He was awarded a joint Nobel Prize in Literature in 1974 together with fellow Swede Eyvind Johnson "for writings that catch the dewdrop and reflect the cosmos". The choice was controversial, as both Martinson and Johnson were members of the academy.

He has been called "the great reformer of 20th-century Swedish poetry, the most original of the writers called 'proletarian'."

Life 
Martinson was born in Jämshög, Blekinge County in south-eastern Sweden. At a young age he lost both his parents, his father died of tuberculosis in 1910 and a year later his mother emigrated to Portland, Oregon leaving behind her children,  whereafter Martinson was placed as a foster child (Kommunalbarn) in the Swedish countryside. At the age of sixteen Martinson ran away and signed onto a ship to spend the next years sailing around the world visiting countries including Brazil and India.

A few years later lung problems forced him to set ashore in Sweden where he travelled around without a steady employment, at times living as a vagabond on country roads. At the age of 21, he was arrested for vagrancy in Lundagård park, Lund.

In 1929, he debuted as a poet. Together with Artur Lundkvist, Gustav Sandgren, Erik Asklund and Josef Kjellgren he authored the anthology Fem unga (Five Youths), which introduced Swedish modernism. His poetry, characterized by linguistic innovation and a frequent use of metaphors, combined an acute eye for, and love of nature, with a deeply felt humanism. His popular success as a novelist came with the semi-autobiographical Nässlorna blomma (Flowering Nettle) in 1935, about hardships encountered by a young boy in the countryside. It has since been translated into more than thirty languages. The novel Vägen till Klockrike (The Road to Klockrike, 1948) was another huge success, and in 1949 Martinson became the first proletarian writer to be elected a member of the Swedish Academy.

One of his most noted works is the poetic cycle Aniara, which is a story of the spacecraft Aniara that during a journey through space loses its course and subsequently floats on without destination. The book was published in 1956 and became an opera in 1959 composed by Karl-Birger Blomdahl. The cycle has been described as "an epic story of man's fragility and folly".

From 1929 to 1940, he was married to novelist Moa Martinson, prominent as a feminist and proletarian author, whom he met through a Stockholm anarchist newspaper, Brand. He travelled to the Soviet Union in 1934. He and Moa were divorced due to her criticism of his lack of political commitment. Harry married Ingrid Lindcrantz (1916–1994) in 1942.

Writing
Harry Martinson debuted in 1929 with the collection of poems Spökskepp (Ghost Ship), that for the most part employed motifs of the ocean and life as a seaman. The same year he contributed to anthology Fem unga, a ground-breaking and highly influential book in modernist Swedish literature. Martinson's major breakthrough was his 1931 poetry collection Nomad. His poetry was noted for rich imagery with precise observations that emphazised details. In the books Resor utan mål (Aimless journeys, 1932) and Kap Farväl! (1933; English translation Cape Farewell, 1934) Martinson recalled memories of his life as a seaman. In his later writing nature and the earth became increasingly important motifs. During the 1930s he developed a mastery in describing nature in both prose and poetry and was especially noted for his short nature poems with precise observations. In the autobiographical novels Nässlorna blomma (Flowering Nettle, 1935) and Vägen ut (The Way Out, 1936) Martinson tells about his childhood. Martinson had a strong interest in science which was a prominent influence in his work. In his book Verklighet till döds (Reality to Death, 1940) written during World War II Martinson criticized contemporary social conditions and technological development. Criticism of modern culture is also a theme in Martinson's philosophical vagabond novel Vägen till Klockrike (1948; English translation The Road, 1950) and the collection of poems Passad (1945).

In his later writing Martinson developed a new major theme based on his increasing interest in outer space and the cosmic. This came to most distinct expression in Aniara (1956), a poetic space epic that became Martinson's best known work. In his late work criticism of modern life and its technology came to an even stronger expression in his 1960 poetry collection Vagnen (The Wagon), which unlike his previous books was not well received by contemporary critics. Sensitive to criticism it appeared to be Martinson's last published collection of poems, but in 1971 he returned with Dikter om ljus och mörker (Poems of Light and Darkness), which was followed by a collection of nature poems Tuvor (Tufts) in 1973.

Death 
The sensitive Martinson found it hard to cope with the criticism following his 1974 Nobel Prize award in Literature, and committed suicide on 11February 1978 at the Karolinska University Hospital in Stockholm by cutting his stomach open with a pair of scissors in what has been described as a "hara-kiri-like manner".

Legacy 
Martinson is widely regarded as the greatest Swedish author since August Strindberg. The 100th anniversary of Martinson's birth was celebrated around Sweden in 2004. The Cikada Prize is awarded in memory of Harry Martinson since that year. The Harry Martinson Society was founded in 1984 and awards the Harry Martinson Prize to individuals or organisations working in the spirit of Harry Martinson. The Swedish Academy awards a scholarship in memory of Harry Martinson to an author writing in Swedish.

Bibliography 
Titles in English where known.

Novels 
Kap Farväl (Cape Farewell) 1933
Nässlorna blomma (Flowering Nettle) 1935
Vägen ut (The Way Out) 1936
Den förlorade jaguaren (The Lost Jaguar) 1941
Vägen till Klockrike (The Road) 1948

Essays 
Resor utan mål (Aimless Journeys) 1932
Svärmare och harkrank 1937
Midsommardalen (Midsommer valley) 1938
Det enkla och det svåra (The easy and the hard) 1938
Verklighet till döds (Reality to death) 1940
Utsikt från en grästuva (Views From A Tuft of Grass) 1963

Poems 
Spökskepp 1929
Nomad 1931. Illustrated edition 1943 with new poems and drawings by Torsten Billman
Passad (Trade Wind) 1945
Cikada 1953
Aniara 1956
Gräsen i Thule 1958
Vagnen 1960
Dikter om ljus och mörker 1971
Tuvor 1973

Radio plays 
Gringo
Salvation 1947
Lotsen från Moluckas 1948

Stage play 
Tre knivar från Wei 1964

Psalms 
De blomster som i marken bor

Works in English 
 Cape Farewell (Kap Farväl!), 1934 - translated by Naomi Walford
 Flowering Nettle (Nässlorna blomma), 1936 - translated by Naomi Walford
 The Road (Vägen till Klockrike), 1955 - translated by M.A. Michael
 Friends, you drank some darkness Three Swedish Poets: Harry Martinson, Gunnar Ekelöf and Tomas Tranströmer, 1975 - translated by Robert Bly
 Aniara, 1976 - translated by Hugh McDiarmid and Elsepeth Harley Schubert 
 Wild Bouquet Nature Poems, 1985 - translated by William Jay Smith and Leif Sjöberg
 Aniara, 1991 - translated by Stephen Klass and Leif Sjöberg
 Views From a Tuft of Grass (Utsikt från en grästuva), 2005 - translated by Lars Nordström and Erland Anderson

References

External links 

 
 A translator's look at Flowering Nettles  Swedish book review
 

1904 births
1978 deaths
1978 suicides
 
People from Olofström Municipality
Writers from Blekinge
Swedish science fiction writers
Members of the Swedish Academy
Nobel laureates in Literature
Suicides by sharp instrument in Sweden
Swedish-language writers
Swedish Nobel laureates
Dobloug Prize winners
Swedish poets
20th-century Swedish novelists
20th-century Swedish poets
Swedish male poets
Swedish male novelists